Irving Whale is a Canadian barge that sank off the north coast of Prince Edward Island, while en route from Halifax, Nova Scotia to Bathurst, New Brunswick, with a cargo of Bunker C oil in a rich fishing area. It is "one of Canada's most notorious nautical disasters". The barge,  owned by J.D. Irving Ltd., had carried oil for JDI from 1967 until it sank in 1970. She was refloated in 1996, re-fitted as a deck barge, re-activated, and renamed ATL 2701 in 2001 and renamed again in 2009, as Atlantic Sea Lion. Since the accident, she only transports dry cargo.

The barge was refloated in complex, $42 million 70-hour successful recovery in July 1996. It had been well-built and was in  "remarkably good condition, preserved by the cool waters and smooth seabed of the Gulf of St. Lawrence."

The barge was reclaimed by JDI Irving Limited , and towed to Halifax by JDI's Atlantic Towing, where the oil and PCBs were pumped out and the oil sold.

Atlantic Sea Lion, Atlantic Marlin/Swordfish, Atlantic Shark, Atlantic Tuna, and Irving Beaver, are the five barges currently listed in the service of JDI's subsidiary Atlantic Towing.

The federal government of Canada lost a lawsuit through which an attempt was made to recoup the $42 million for the recovery of the Irving Whale. In 2000, the federal government reached a $5 million out-of-court settlement with JDI, which was described as the "worst precedent" of the "Polluter Pays Principle". JDI is a subsidiary of the powerful 96-year-old family-run Saint John, New Brunswick-based Irving Group of Companies, founded by the entrepreneur and industrialist, K. C. Irving  (1899–1992).

Background

The barge—Irving Whale—was laid down at the Saint John Shipbuilding & Dry Dock Co., Ltd., Saint John in 1966. She was launched and commissioned by owner J.D. Irving Limited in 1967. The barge was designed as a tanker barge to carry petroleum products, mostly fuel oil, in spacious eight below-deck cargo tanks, in addition to deck cargo on the main deck. From 1967 to 1970, Irving Whale saw extensive use in the waters of Atlantic Canada after entering service.  The barge's fuel cargo tanks were used exclusively by Irving Oil, a sister company to barge owner J.D. Irving Ltd. She delivered fuel oil such as Bunker C to major industrial customers such as electrical generating stations and pulp and paper mills, as well as top-deck general cargo.

In a 1996 CBC report, as she remained at the bottom of the ocean, it called Irving Whale "a pollution timebomb", located in a "very rich fishing area"-an "ecological system" that stretched far into the southern Gulf of Saint Lawrence.

According to a 1995 Maclean's article, J. D. Irving Ltd., took possession of Irving Whale and her cargo and was considering at that time "whether it can be repaired and used again—and whether the oil it was carrying [could] be sold."  In 1997, Irving Whale was renamed and repurposed. She now is used exclusively to carry general cargo on deck, such as wood chips and structural steel. Her area of operations is primarily Atlantic Canada.  In December 2007 ATL 2701 was contracted to haul a cargo of steel pipes through the St. Lawrence Seaway into Lake Ontario destined for the Portlands Energy Centre project in Toronto Harbour.  The ATL 2701/Atlantic Sea Lion  was reported in 2018 as frequently wintering over in Halifax, and mainly being used by Irving to "transport components from Irving Shipbuilding's Woodside fabrication facility to the Halifax Shipyard."

Sinking of the Irving Whale (1970)

On Saturday, 5 September 1970, the tugboat Irving Maple departed Halifax, Nova Scotia towing Irving Whale at 0845 local time.

Irving Maple towed Irving Whale east from Halifax Harbour along the Eastern Shore, then through the Strait of Canso, transiting the Canso Canal into the Northumberland Strait on Sunday 6 September 1970 at 1300 local time.  The tug/barge took a northerly course into the central Gulf of St. Lawrence, passing between East Point, Prince Edward Island and the Magdalen Islands before turning northwest toward the entrance of Chaleur Bay.

The tug/barge made approximately  until reaching the open Gulf of St. Lawrence between Prince Edward Island and the Magdalen Islands, where Irving Maple reported wind gusts approaching  and choppy seas early on the morning of Monday, 7 September 1970.

Witnesses stated that the barge, which was being towed was unmanned, and it was "riding low in the water under the weight of 4,297 tons 4,773,967 litres of Bunker C fuel oil."

Immediately after the tow was lengthened, the stern of Irving Whale submerged and the barge took a 45° list.  The crew of Irving Maple provided continuous radio updates to the Canadian Coast Guard as they observed the barge founder over the next 3 hours.

At 1023 local time on 7 September 1970, Irving Whale sank at 

The exact location of the wreck was known immediately after the sinking as Irving Maple'''s tow line remained connected to Irving Whale.

Since Irving Whale sank stern first following progressive flooding over a three-hour period, the barge ended up settling in an upright position.  The seafloor in the vicinity of the wreck was level and composed of sedimentary sandstone and sand.

The cause of the sinking was attributed to two possible causes as a result of poor weather conditions which potentially caused seawater to accumulate in the aft end of the open deck cargo area,or seawater to flood the engine room through an open door (the barge had a small engine for powering oil cargo pumps and heating systems).

Irving Whale bunker C fuel and PCBs

An unknown amount of bunker C floated into the Atlantic Ocean through the Cabot Strait and some washed ashore on Prince Edward Island as well. Over the 26 years following the sinking of the Irving Whale, oil leak affected "about 80 kilometres of shoreline on the nearby Magdalen Islands and leaked into the Atlantic Ocean from the wreck".

In the fall of 1970 a visual inspection was undertaken of the wreck by a submersible vessel.  Divers secured pressure relief vents to prevent further leaks.  The sinking of Irving Whale resulted in the heating system for the bunker C shutting down.  Within days, the cold waters of the Gulf of St. Lawrence caused the oil to congeal, reducing leakage from the barge.

As a result, the International Convention on Civil Liability for Oil Pollution Damage held jurisdiction over the pollution caused by the cargo of bunker C leaking from wreck of Irving Whale. Canada's ratification of the Third United Nations Convention on the Law of the Sea (UNCLOS III) in 1977 saw its jurisdiction extended beyond the  territorial sea to include waters within the new  exclusive economic zone, thus taking jurisdiction over the Irving Whale wreck.

As a result of the sinking, J.D. Irving Ltd. abandoned ownership of the wreck, since it was considered to be in international waters.

From the time of its sinking in 1970 until its salvage in 1996 the Canadian Coast Guard made regular aircraft and surface surveillance of the wreck site to check for pollution; Transport Canada, Fisheries and Oceans Canada and Environment Canada assisted CCG in surveillance operations. Throughout the 1970s until its salvage in 1996, Irving Whale had continued to experience minor leakage from her cargo vents and other valves.

In his May 2014 court decision on Irving versus their insurers, Justice Sean Harrington said that the federal "government of the day was pursuing a political agenda...This was post Exxon Valdez"—in reference to the 1989 Exxon Valdez oil spill.  "[T]he principle of 'polluter pays' was in vogue...although the precise timing of the refloating may have been political, the fact remains that the Irving Whale would have broken up, probably sooner, rather than later, she would corrode and break up, releasing well over 3,000 [tonnes] of oil to the great prejudice of the marine habitat, the shoreline, and those dependent upon the sea and shore."

In September 1990 the Public Review Panel on Tanker Safety and Marine Response Capability noted the thinning of the barge's hull and the potential for a catastrophic release of the remaining cargo of bunker C fuel oil. It recommended a decision be made within 12 months on whether to remove the oil and/or raise Irving Whale. Both Transport Canada and Environment Canada commissioned two additional studies in 1992 to evaluate options for dealing with the barge and its cargo; both studies recommended pumping the oil without raising the barge. In 1993, the Ship-source Oil Pollution Fund, Canada's domestic replacement to the International Convention on Civil Liability for Oil Pollution Damage, commissioned a study of Irving Whale; it confirmed both pumping the oil or lifting the barge with oil on board were feasible, however lifting the barge with the oil was preferable as it was less risky to the environment.

A 1993 inspection of the wreck confirmed additional small leaks from cargo vents; hatches were reinforced and the vents sealed. That same year, the CCG created two Public Advisory Committees, one in Prince Edward Island and the other in the Magdalen Islands as part of a consultation process for dealing with the wreck.

In 1994 the Government of Canada committed to raising Irving Whale and cleaning the wreck site from contamination.

$42 million Irving Whale salvage (1996)

In 1971, the Government of Canada Department of Transport issued a biddings for dredging of the Irving Whale. In a 19 March 1975 CBC As it Happens interview, five years after the sinking, concerns were raised about an ecological catastrophe on PEI shores with a million gallons of Bunker C still in the hold of the Whale. Conservative MP for P.E.I. Keith McQuarrie, said that a dredging project to raise the Whale had been dropped because of overpriced bidding by 3 companies—Atlantic Salvage and Dredging, Marine Industries Limited, and Murphy Industries, who had submitted tenders in 1973 ranging from $1.7 million to over $4 million. The estimates were higher than the government had estimated so no dredging was undertaken. A later investigation on corporations colluding in a number tenders involving twenty defendants, resulted in the Supreme Court Case R v Canadian Dredge & Dock Co. The Irving Whale dredging tender was part of this case and it was revealed that a process of bid rigging had occurred. The defendants included four corporations-Canadian Dredge & Dock Company, Marine Industries Limited, The J.P. Porter Company Limited, and Richelieu Dredging Corporation Inc.). The corporations were charged and convicted of fraud and conspiracy.

On 23 June 1995, J.D. Irving Ltd. revealed the presence of PCB fluid within the cargo heating system pipes of the barge. The Canadian Coast Guard were embarrassed that they had not detected the presence of PCBs.

Concerns were raised that the PCBs could be released if attempts were made to raise the Whale or to remove the Bunker C oil. In response to the filing of an injunction by the "Société pour vaincre la pollution Inc." (SVP) and the "Regroupement madelinot pour la protection du golfe Inc."  to stop salvage efforts pending an investigation under the Canadian Environmental Protection Act.  The Federal Court of Canada granted a three-month court injunction 21 August 1995, to halt the operation, which has already begun with preparatory work on the barge on 18 July 1995.  The recovery was postponed until the next "weather window" in summer 1996. Environmentalists called the Irving Whale "a pollution timebomb" as the Whale was in a "very rich fishing area"-an "ecological system" that stretches far into the southern Gulf of Saint Lawrence.

In March 1995 Environment Canada reached an agreement with an Irving Oil company—Atlantic Towing Ltd.—to provide assistance in the salvage operation, and with Irving Shipbuilding, who would clean and recover of Irving Whale upon her salvage.  In June 1995, Donjon McAllister Joint Venture of New Jersey won the contract to lift Irving Whale with a tendered price of $12.1 million.

Further analysis of the environmental consequences of salvaging Irving Whale took place in fall 1995 and winter 1996.  In April 1996 SVP dropped its injunction against the project.

On 30 July 1996, Irving Whale was hoisted by derrick barges Chesapeake and Boabarge 9 to the surface in approximately 70 minutes.  Irving Whale was then floated on board the semi-submersible barge Boabarge 10, which transported Irving Whale to Halifax, Nova Scotia. Irving Whale arrived in Halifax Harbour on 7 August 1996 and was transferred to the care of Irving Shipbuilding.  The barge's cargo was removed and the cargo hold cleaned before the barge underwent a refit at Irving Shipbuilding subsidiary Halifax Dartmouth Industries Limited.  Following refit, the barge was transferred to Atlantic Towing Ltd. and renamed ATL 2701 in 2001 for service as a general cargo barge. 'It was renamed again as Atlantic Sea Lion  in 2009.

The Atlantic Sea Lion, the Atlantic Marlin/Swordfish, the Atlantic Shark, the Atlantic Tuna, and the Irving Beaver, are the five barges currently listed in the service of JDI's subsidiary Atlantic Towing.

Federal government paid for $33 million salvage 
The cost of the salvage operation was $42 million.  This cost of the salvage operation, which totalled $42 million was assumed by the federal government with great controversy, given the wealth of Irving Oil Ltd., owner of the cargo of oil, and J.D. Irving Ltd., owner of the barge.

On 29 July 1997 the federal government sued in the Federal Court to recover the $42 million with the owners of Irving Whale, J.D. Irving Ltd., as well as the Ship Source Oil Pollution Fund and the International Oil Pollution Compensation Fund 1971.  In Canada v J.D. Irving Ltd., the plaintiff (the federal government) sought action against the defendants (the barge's owners and charterers) based on the statutory liability of an "owner" under subsection 677(1) of the Canada Shipping Act, as well as on the torts of negligence and nuisance. The defendants centred their defence on whether the action by the government was time barred and whether legislation created after the sinking of Irving Whale could be applied retroactively. The case was heard on 9–10 December 1998 in Montreal.  The decision was released on 21 December 1998 in favour of the defendants. The federal government filed an appeal in the Federal Court of Appeal in 1999 that was heard on 2 May 2000.  The appeal was rejected.

On 17 July 2000, the federal government reached a $5 million out-of-court settlement with J.D. Irving Ltd. to recover some of the $42 million it cost to salvage of Irving Whale. Daniel Green of the environmental group SVP said if this is an example of the 1985 "Polluter Pays Principle", it is "the worst precedent that one could have." The $5 million is in addition to the $4 million that J.D. Irving Ltd. contributed during the recovery and clean-up of Irving Whale''.  In reality, Irving did not directly pay this $5 million, but managed to receive an insurance payout to cover this cost."The Canadian government had to pay the remainder of the recovery costs, which amounted to $33 million.

According to Irving, the company’s salvage company, Atlantic Salvage, had assisted with $4 million of the cleanup costs. J. D. Irving Ltd., environmental director, Bill Borland, said that the Irving organization had contributed "assistance worth "millions of dollars" by having tugs, barges and pumps at the scene in case of an oil spill during the operation."

Reactivation as ATL 2701
The Irving Whale was refit and renamed ATL 2701 and put into active service as a barge for the Irving company. Cargoes included wood chips, steel pipes mainly in Atlantic Canada and also in 2007 Toronto Harbour.

Aftermath
Environment Canada said in February 1999, that testing showed that there were still approximately "150 kilograms of PCBs" on the ocean floor where the Whale had sunk.  This represents approximately 1% of the amount of PCBs in the entire Gulf of St. Lawrence.While "neither human nor marine life" was "threatened", "commercial fishing in the immediate area" was "prohibited." The Department of Fisheries and Oceans announced in April 1999 that, based on a third party report and consultation with the "crab fishing industry", they would take a "precautionary approach in addressing the status of the fishing exclusion zone" and keep the existing closure in place while continuing long-term monitoring of the site contaminated by polychlorinated biphenyl (PCB).

While the dispute with the federal government had ended in 2000, with the Irving companies paying $5-million "without admitting liability", this legal battle between the Irvings and their insurers who, "coincidentally, had covered them for up to $5-million". The policy was decades-old and that the Irvings were not legally obliged to pay $5 million. In his May 2014 court decision which ruled in favour of the Irvings, Justice Sean Harrington said that the government had "concluded the Irving Whale was "a time bomb", and that "[s]ooner, rather than later, she would corrode and break up, releasing well over 3,000 [tonnes] of oil to the great prejudice of the marine habitat, the shoreline, and those dependent upon the sea and shore." If it had gone to trial,  the settlement could have been as much as $20 million.

Notes

See also
List of shipwrecks in 1970

References

Further reading
 The Sinking and Raising of the Irving Whale Canadian Broadcasting Corporation
 Operation Irving Whale Environment Canada
 Environmental Emergencies - Irving Whale Barge Environment Canada
 Canada's RADARSAT Satellite Captures the Irving Whale Salvage Natural Resources Canada

Barges of Canada
1966 ships
Maritime incidents in 1970
Transport disasters in 1970
1970 disasters in Canada